RPX may refer to:

RPX Corporation
Roundup Airport IATA code 
Regal Premium Experience, a theater format by Regal Entertainment Group.